Andreas Prochaska (born 31 December 1964) is an Austrian film director and editor. He directed the 2014 film The Dark Valley, the 2017 miniseries Maximilian and Marie of Bourgogne, and the 2018 series Das Boot, among others. He has contributed to more than thirty films since 1998. 

Prochaska is the director of the TV series Alex Rider, based on the teen spy novel series of books by Anthony Horowitz.

Selected filmography

References

External links 

1964 births
Living people
Austrian film directors
Austrian television directors
Austrian film editors